Fatehganj is a suburb in Faizabad city, in the Faizabad district (officially Ayodhya district) of Uttar Pradesh, India.

Demographics
 India census, Rikabganj had a population of 85,990. Males constitute 51% of the population and females 49%. Fatehganj has an average literacy rate of 62%, higher than the national average of 59.5%: male literacy is 71%, and female literacy is 52%. In Fatehganj, 17% of the population is under 6 years of age.

References

Neighbourhoods in Faizabad